The 1998 New York Giants season was the team's 74th season in the National Football League. The team failed to improve upon their previous season's output of 10–5–1, winning only eight games and missing the playoffs. 

One of their wins, however, came against the defending Super Bowl champion Denver Broncos in Week 15. Trailing by three late in the fourth quarter, Amani Toomer caught a deep touchdown pass from Kent Graham to give them a 20-16 lead which held when the defense stopped the Broncos on their final drive. The Broncos had not lost a game since Week 16 of the previous season, having won their last regular season game, three playoff games, Super Bowl XXXII, and the first thirteen games of the 1998 season entering the matchup with the Giants.

Offseason

NFL Draft

Personnel

Staff

Roster

Regular season

Schedule 

Note: Intra-division opponents are in bold text.

Standings

See also 
 List of New York Giants seasons

References 

New York Giants seasons
New York Giants
New York Giants season
20th century in East Rutherford, New Jersey
Meadowlands Sports Complex